Cephalotaxus mannii is a species of plant in the family Taxaceae. While the species is widespread, its populations are fragmented and it is threatened by cutting for timber as well as for using its bark and leaves for medicinal extracts.

Sometimes (e.g.) the species Cephalotaxus griffithii and Cephalotaxus hainanensis are considered synonyms of this species.

References

mannii
Trees of China
Flora of Assam (region)
Trees of Indo-China
Vulnerable plants
Taxa named by Joseph Dalton Hooker